Hatten Baratli (born 9 January 1991) is a Tunisian professional footballer who plays as a midfielder for CA Bizertin.

External links 
 

1991 births
Living people
Tunisian footballers
Tunisian expatriate footballers
Tunisia international footballers
Association football midfielders
Damac FC players
Ohod Club players
Al-Shoulla FC players
Al-Kawkab FC players
Club Africain players
CA Bizertin players
Saudi First Division League players
Tunisian Ligue Professionnelle 1 players
Expatriate footballers in Saudi Arabia
2013 Africa Cup of Nations players